Myxophyllum steenstrupi is a symbiotic ciliate living in the body slime and mantle cavity of terrestrial pulmonates which was rediscovered after almost 30 years.

References

Philasterida